The Masjid-e-Kabud or Rawze-e-Sharif, located in Mazar-i-Sharif, Afghanistan, is a mosque which Sunni Muslims believe contains the tomb of Ali ibn Abi Talib. Sunnis regard Ali as their Fourth Rightly Guided Caliph and they pay tribute to Ali's shrine every year. Besides the two aforementioned names the site also has many other native names as Mazar-e-Ali, Ziyarat-e-Ali, Masjid-e-Ali Mazar. Abroad the mosque is often referred to as Blue Mosque, referencing the pale blue tiles, dominating the appearance of the building.

The site is also where many pilgrims annually celebrate Nowruz. At the annual Jahenda Bala ceremony, a holy flag is raised in honour of Hazrat Ali. People touch the flag for luck in the New Year.

History 
When Hazrat Ali was martyred, Afghans believed that his body was taken and buried in the Afghan city of Mazar-e-Sharif at this site. Ali was reportedly brought here by a white camel in order to save his remains from the desecration by his enemies. However, Shia Muslims believe that Hazrat Ali is buried in the Imam Ali Mosque at Najaf in Iraq. Alternatively, the personage buried in the shrine may have predated Islam. Identifying the shrine with Hazrat Ali could likely be a myth to ensure the tomb would be protected and honored by the Islamic establishment. Historical studies confirm that the owner of the shrine is Ali bin Abi Talib Al-Balkhi, captain of the Alevis in Balkh during his time. 

The Sultan of the Seljuq dynasty, Ahmed Sanjar, built the first known shrine at this location. It was destroyed or hidden under earthen embankment during the invasion of Genghis Khan around 1220. In the 15th century, Timurid Sultan Husayn Bayqarah Mirza built a mosque over the tomb of Hazrat Ali. It is by far the most important landmark in Mazar-i-Sharif and it is believed that the name of city originates from this shrine.

A site plan of the location made in the 1910s shows that there had earlier been a smaller walled precinct in the mosque, which was razed to create park lands later, although the portals to this precinct still remain as gateways for the shrine.

Tombs of varying dimensions were added for a number of Afghan political and religious leaders over the years, which has led to the development of its current irregular dimensions. These include the square domed tomb of Wazir Akbar Khan and a similar structure for Emir Sher Ali and his family.

A local legend claims that the entire mosque was once buried to protect it from Mongol armies although no evidence has been found to support this claim.

Gallery

See also
List of mosques in Afghanistan
Nauruz in Afghanistan

References

Mosques in Afghanistan
Shrines in Afghanistan
Buildings and structures in Balkh Province
Mazar-i-Sharif